Big Hill is a summit in Alberta, Canada.

Big Hill was so named on account of its size.

References

Hills of Alberta